The .22 Long Rifle or simply .22 LR or 22 (metric designation: 5.6×15mmR) is a long-established variety of .22 caliber rimfire ammunition originating from the United States. It is used in a wide range of rifles, pistols, revolvers, smoothbore shotguns, and submachine guns.

In terms of units sold it is by far the most common ammunition in the world today. Common uses include hunting and shooting sports. Ammunition produced in .22 Long Rifle is effective at short ranges, has little recoil, and is cheap to purchase, making it ideal for training.

History
American firearms manufacturer J. Stevens Arms & Tool Company introduced the .22 Long Rifle cartridge in 1887.<ref name="Kokalis">{{cite book|last = Kokalis |first = Peter |title = Weapons Tests and Evaluations: The Best of Soldier of Fortune |date = January 2001 |page = 331 |publisher = Paladin Press |publication-date = 2001 |isbn = 978-1-58160-122-0}}</ref> The round owes its origin to the .22 BB Cap of 1845 and the .22 Short of 1857. It combined the case of the .22 Long of 1871 with a  bullet, giving it a longer overall length, a higher muzzle velocity and superior performance as a hunting and target round, rendering the .22 Extra Long cartridges obsolete. The .22 LR uses a heeled bullet, which means that the bullet is the same diameter as the case, and has a narrower "heel" portion that fits in the case. It is one of the few cartridges that are accepted by a large variety of rifles and handguns.

Popularity
The .22 LR cartridge is popular with both novice shooters and experts. Its minimal recoil and relatively low noise make it an ideal cartridge for recreational shooting, small-game hunting, and pest control. .22 LR cadet rifles are commonly used by military cadets and others for basic firearms and marksmanship training. It is used by the Boy Scouts of America for the rifle shooting merit badge.

The low recoil of the cartridge makes it ideal for introductory firearms courses. Novice shooters can be surprised or frightened by the noise and recoil of more powerful rounds. Beginners shooting firearms beyond their comfort level frequently develop a habit of flinching in an attempt to counter anticipated recoil. The resulting habit impedes correct posture and follow-through at the most critical phase of the shot and is difficult to correct. With high recoil eliminated, other errors in marksmanship technique are easier to identify and correct.

Available for this round are AR-15 upper receivers and M1911 slide assemblies. Many handgun manufacturers have an upper pistol conversion kit to make it shoot .22 LR ammunition. These conversions allow shooters to practice inexpensively while retaining the handling characteristics of their chosen firearms (with reduced recoil and muzzle blast). Additionally, .22 LR cartridge conversion kits allow practice at indoor ranges which prohibit high-power firearms. Owners of guns that use gas systems, such as AR-15 sport style rifles, normally avoid firing non-jacketed .22 LR cartridge ammunition, as the use of unjacketed ammunition may cause lead-fouling of the gas-port inside the barrel and costly gunsmithing procedures. This can usually be mitigated by swapping the conversion kit for the standard bolt carrier group, and firing several full-powered rounds to clear the gas port and tube of any accumulated lead fouling. While not 100% effective, the extremely hot incandescent gasses produced by centerfire rifle ammunition will help to clear any lead fouling from the .22 LR ammunition.

A wide variety of .22 LR ammunition is available commercially, and the available ammunition varies widely both in price and performance. Promotional loads for plinking can be purchased in bulk for significantly less cost than precision target rounds. The low cost of ammunition has a substantial effect on the popularity of the .22 LR. For this reason, rimfire cartridges are commonly used for target practice.

.22 LR cartridges are commonly packaged in boxes of 50 or 100 rounds, and are often sold by the 'brick', a carton containing either 10 boxes of 50 rounds or loose cartridges totaling 500 rounds, or the 'case' containing 10 bricks totaling 5,000 rounds. Annual production is estimated by some at 2–2.5 billion rounds. The NSSF estimates that a large percentage of the US production of 10 billion cartridges is composed of .22 LR. Despite the high production figures there have occasionally been shortages of .22 LR cartridge in the contiguous United States, most notably during the U.S. ammunition shortage of the late 2000s and early 2010s.

 Performance 

After 150 yd, the ballistics of the round are such that it will be difficult to compensate for the large "drop". The relatively short effective range, low report, and light recoil have made it a favorite for use as a target-practice cartridge. The accuracy of the cartridge is good, but not exceptional; various cartridges are capable of the same or better accuracy. A contributing factor in rifles is the transition of even a high-velocity cartridge projectile from supersonic to subsonic within . As the bullet slows, the shock wave caused by supersonic travel overtakes the bullet and can disrupt its flight path, causing minor but measurable inaccuracies.

As a hunting cartridge, rimfires are mainly used to kill small game up to the size of coyotes. Although proper shot placement can kill larger animals such as deer or hog, it is not recommended because its low power may not guarantee a humane kill. In 2013, an elephant was killed by multiple shots from a .22 LR rifle.

Because a .22 LR bullet is less powerful than larger cartridges, its danger to humans is often underestimated. In fact, a .22 LR bullet is easily capable of killing or injuring humans. Ricochets are more common in .22 LR projectiles than for more powerful cartridges as the combination of unjacketed lead and moderate velocities allows the projectile to deflectnot penetrate or disintegratewhen hitting hard objects at a glancing angle. A .22 LR bullet can ricochet off the surface of water at a low angle of aim. Severe injury may result to a person or object in the line of fire on the opposite shore, several hundred yards away.

Rimfire bullets are generally either plain lead with a wax coating (for standard-velocity loads) or plated with copper or gilding metal (for high-velocity or hyper-velocity loads). The thin copper layer on plated bullet functions as a lubricant reducing friction between the bullet and the barrel, thus reducing barrel wear. Plating also prevents oxidation of the lead bullet. Lead tends to oxidize if stored for long periods. On a plain lead bullet, oxide on the bullet's surface can increase its diameter enough to either prevent insertion of the cartridge into the chamber, or – with high velocity rounds – cause dangerously high pressures in the barrel, potentially rupturing the cartridge case and injuring the shooter; for that reason, standard and subsonic cartridges usually use a wax lubricant on lead bullets.

Variants
The variety of .22 LR loads are often divided into four distinct categories, based on nominal velocity:
 Subsonic-velocity: which also includes "target" or "match" loads, at nominal speeds below .
 Standard-velocity: 
 High-velocity: 
 Hyper-velocity, or Ultra-velocity: over 

Subsonic

Subsonic rounds have a muzzle velocity of less than the speed of sound (about ). Conversely, these rounds may contain little more than a primer and an extra-light bullet.

Subsonic rounds are favored by some shooters due to slightly superior accuracy and reduction in noise. Supersonic rounds produce a loud crack which can scare away animals when hunting. Accuracy is reportedly improved with subsonic rounds because a supersonic bullet (or projectile) that slows from supersonic to subsonic speed undergoes drastic aerodynamic changes in this transonic zone that might adversely affect the stability and accuracy of the bullet.

Hence, a "subsonic" round used below this temperature may be supersonic, and during the transition from supersonic to subsonic velocity, it may become unstable, reducing accuracy.

Various combinations of subsonic rounds and semiautomatic .22 LR firearms result in unreliable cycling of the firearms' actions, as the result of insufficient recoil energy. Some subsonic rounds use heavier bullets (achieving lower velocities) to ensure, as a result of increased bullet mass, that enough energy is produced to cycle common blow-back actions. As an example, the Aguila .22 LR SSS "Sniper SubSonic" round, has a  bullet on a .22 short case, providing the cartridge the same overall dimensions as a .22 long rifle round. However, other problems may be encountered: the heavier and longer bullet of the Aguila cartridge requires a faster barrel twist (by the Greenhill formula) to ensure the bullet remains stable in flight.

Two performance classes of .22 rimfire subsonic rounds exist. Some subsonic rounds, such as various .22 short and .22 long "CB" rounds, give about  velocity with a  bullet providing relatively low impact energy (41 J at muzzle). These may not use any, or only small amounts of gunpowder, and have the characteristics of rounds intended only for indoor training or target practice rather than hunting. Where these are in .22 LR form, it is only to aid feeding in firearms designed for the cartridge, rather than older .22 CB shooting gallery rifles. The Aguila SSS gives about  velocity with a 60-gr bullet offering energy (163 Joules) equivalent to many high velocity .22 long rifle rounds using standard 40-gr bullets. Other heavy-bullet subsonic rounds give similar performance, and are intended for hunting of small game, or control of dangerous animals, while avoiding excessive noise.

Standard velocity

The velocity of standard-velocity .22 LR rounds varies between manufacturers. Standard-velocity cartridges generate near or slightly supersonic velocities. These rounds generally do not develop these velocities in handguns because their short barrels do not take full advantage of the slower burning powder.

High velocity

The .22 long rifle round was originally loaded with black powder. The first smokeless powder loads were intended to match the standard velocity of the original black-powder rounds. Smokeless powder is more efficient than black powder, and the cartridge cases could hold more powder. Smokeless powder loads, called "high speed" or "high velocity", were offered by the major ammunition makers, giving a typical velocity increase of 8% ( to ) while still using the standard  solid or  hollow-point lead bullet.

Hyper-velocity
Many .22 LR cartridges use bullets lighter than the standard , fired at even higher velocities. This higher velocity is partially due to the use of lighter bullets.

The CCI Stinger was the first hyper-velocity .22 LR cartridge, and provided a significant increase in velocity and energy over standard rimfire rounds. This longer case can cause ejection problems in some guns. A powder with a slower burning rate is used to make the most use of the length of a rifle barrel. The powder used in the Stinger increases velocity up to the longest .22 barrel length tested by the NRA, .

Later hyper-velocity rounds were introduced by other makers, based on the long rifle case with lighter bullets in the 30-gr weight range and slow-burning rifle powder loadings. The overall length of many of these cartridges was less than the overall length of the standard 40-gr bullet long rifle cartridge. One example is the Remington Viper; another is the Federal Spitfire.

The CCI Velocitor hyper-velocity round uses the standard long rifle case size and a standard weight  bullet of proprietary hollow-point design to augment expansion and trauma.

Shot cartridges

Special .22 LR caliber shot cartridges, usually loaded with No. 12 shot, have also been made. These are often called "snake shot," "bird shot" and "rat-shot" due to their use in very short range pest control. Such rounds have either a longer brass case that is crimped closed, or a translucent plastic "bullet" that contains the shot and shatters upon firing. In specially made .22-bore shotguns, the shot shells can be used for short-range skeet shooting and trap shooting at special, scaled-down, clay targets.

Full metal jacket
During World War II, a full metal jacket bullet version of the .22 LR was developed as the T-42 for the suppressed High Standard HDM pistol. The US Army Air Corps procured the Savage Model 24 .22 LR/.410 combination gun as an air crew survival weapon included in the E series of survival and sustenance kits, primarily to forage for game for food. The .22 LR full metal jacket bullet ammunition was issued with these firearms for military use to comply with treaty restrictions on expanding bullets.

The 1961 Army/Air Force Technical Manual/Order on ammunition lists three types of rimfire CARTRIDGE, CALIBER .22: Ball, Long Rifle:
Long Rifle (Lead Bullet), propellant: 1.7 gr smokeless, bullet: 40 gr, overall length: .
Long Rifle, M24 (Jacketed Bullet), propellant: 2.5 gr smokeless, bullet: 40.5 gr, overall length: .
The first type specifies standard or target velocity .22 LR while the second is common high velocity commercial ammo. While these soft lead round nose bullet types were suitable for training or target practice, they are not legal for use in a war zone. Since .22 LR air crew survival weapons would probably be used in a war zone and could be used for defense, the M24 round is loaded with a hard lead-antimony alloy core bullet with a gilding metal jacket.

Tracer
Tracer ammunition is also available in .22 Long Rifle rimfire.

Cartridge construction
The traditional .22 rimfire cartridges (BB, CB, short, long, extra long, and long rifle) differ in construction from more modern cartridges in the way the bullet is constructed and held in the case. Bullets for traditional .22 rimfires are the same outside diameter as the case but are constructed with a narrower cupped "heel" on the base of the bullet which is inserted into the case. The case mouth is then crimped around the heel, leaving exposed the majority of the bullet bearing surface that contacts the barrel of the gun. The bearing surface of .22 rimfire bullets is often lubricated and the surface is exposed to contamination. This was a common design in the early black powder cartridge era.

In later cartridges including the .22 WRF and .22 WMR rimfires and modern centerfires, the bullet body is a uniform diameter and the bearing surface is inserted completely within the neck of the cartridge case, held in place by tension from the case neck around the bullet bearing surface (in some cartridges the case mouth may also be crimped into a cannelure (groove) in the bullet). The heeled bullet cartridge is considered weaker than the uniform diameter bullet cartridge which encloses the bearing surface of the bullet within the cartridge neck. Overall reliability of heeled bullet rimfire ammunition is high, but it is lower than the reliability of most centerfire ammunition.

Cartridge length

The .22 LR uses a straight-walled case. Depending upon the type and the feed mechanism employed, a firearm that is chambered for .22 LR may also be able to safely chamber and fire the following shorter rimfire cartridges:
 .22 BB, in cap, short, and long lengths
 .22 CB, in cap, short, long, and long rifle lengths
 .22 Short
 .22 Long
The .22 Long Rifle may also be used in firearms chambered for the obsolete .22 Extra Long.

Usage
Today, rimfire rounds are mainly used for hunting small pests, for sports shooting, for plinking, and for inexpensive training. The .22 LR is the choice for several shooting events: biathlon, bullseye, plus divisions of benchrest shooting, metallic silhouette and pin shooting, most high school, collegiate, Boy Scouts of America, Project Appleseed, 4H shooting events, and many others. It is also used in the precision Rifle and Pistol shooting events at the Olympic Games. Good quality rimfire ammunition can be quite accurate. The main advantages are low cost, low recoil, low noise and high accuracy-to-cost ratio. The main disadvantage is its low power; it is better suited for use on small game and other small animals.

As a defensive cartridge, it is considered inadequate by many, though the small size allows very lightweight, easily concealable handguns which can be carried in circumstances where anything larger would be impractical. Despite their limitations, people can use .22 LR pistols and rifles for defense, and they are common simply because they are prevalent, inexpensive, and widely available.

Most semi-automatic rifles firing .22 LR cartridges will often only work properly when firing standard or high velocity rimfire ammunition, as the low recoil of subsonic rounds is insufficient to cycle the weapon's action. Rifles with manual actions do not have this problem. Due to the low bolt thrust of the .22 LR cartridge, most self-loading firearms chambered for the cartridge use the direct blowback operation system.

The tiny case of the .22 LR and the subsonic velocities (when using subsonic ammunition) make it well suited for use with a firearm suppressor (also known as silencers or sound moderators). The low volume of powder gases means that .22 LR suppressors are often no larger than a bull barrel; the Ruger 10/22 and Ruger MK II are common choices, because of their reliability and low cost, and the resulting product is often nearly indistinguishable from a bull barrel model (although weighing far less). Where firearm suppressors are only minimally restricted, a .22 LR firearm with a suppressor is often favored for plinking, as it does not require hearing protection or disturb the neighbors. Local government agencies sometimes use suppressed rimfire weapons for animal control, since dangerous animals or pests can be dispatched in populated areas without causing undue alarm.

The .22 LR has also seen limited usage by police and military snipers. Its main advantage in this role is its low noise, but it is usually limited to urban operations because of its short range. One study suggests a single head/torso shot suffices, more often than not. See summary table of results from Greg Ellifritz’s Stopping Power study. 

The Israeli military used a suppressed .22 LR rifle in the 1990s for riot control and to "eliminate disturbing dogs prior to operations", though it is now used less often as it has been shown to be more lethal than previously suspected. Some other examples include the use of suppressed High Standard HDM pistols by the American OSS, which was the predecessor organization of the CIA. Francis Gary Powers was issued a suppressed High Standard for the flight in which he was shot down. Suppressed Ruger MK II pistols were used by the US Navy SEALs in the 1990s.

Cartridge dimensions

.22 long rifle maximum C.I.P. cartridge dimensions. All sizes in millimetres (mm).

The common rifling twist rate for this cartridge is 406 mm (1:16 in), six grooves, land width = 2.16 mm, Ø lands = 5.38 mm, Ø grooves = 5.58 mm.

According to the official C.I.P. (Commission Internationale Permanente pour l'Epreuve des Armes à Feu Portatives) rulings the .22 long rifle can handle up to  Pmax piezo pressure. In C.I.P. regulated countries every rifle cartridge combo has to be proofed at 125% of this maximum C.I.P. pressure to certify for sale to consumers.

Because the .22 long rifle round commonly uses a heeled lead or lightly plated bullet, the nominal bullet diameter is larger than the nominal bore diameter to prevent excessive lead fouling that can occur when shooting lead bullets that are the same or slightly smaller than the groove diameter. SAAMI specifies a nominal bullet diameter of 0.2255 with a tolerance of -0.004, while the specified bore diameter is 0.222. In practice, 0.224 or slightly larger bullets are common, with barrel groove diameters commonly around 0.223.

Muzzle velocity (nominal)
  lead:  .22 LR subsonic
  copper plated lead:  .22 LR high velocity
  copper plated lead:  .22 LR hyper-velocity CCI Stinger

Note: actual velocities are dependent on many factors, such as barrel length of a given firearm and manufacturer of a given batch of ammunition, and will vary widely in practice. The above velocities are typical.

See also
 .22 BB
 .22 CB
 .22 Short
 .22 Long
 .22 Extra Long
 .22 Magnum
 .22 Hornet
 .25 ACP
 .220 Rook
 5 mm caliber
 .17 HM2
 Cadet rifle
 List of rimfire cartridges
 Table of handgun and rifle cartridges

References

External links

 22LR Ballistics Chart for 27 different cartridges
 Ballistics By The Inch .22 Results (including .22 Long Rifle).

Pistol and rifle cartridges
Rimfire cartridges
 
Articles containing video clips
Stevens Arms